John Bowyer Buchanan Nichols (13 November 1859 – 2 June 1939), known as Bowyer Nichols, was an English poet and artist.

Nichols was the son of Francis Morgan Nichols, an editor and writer, and was paternally descended from the printer and writer John Bowyer Nichols, author of Literary Anecdotes of the Eighteenth Century. He was educated at Winchester and Balliol and became a trustee of the Wallace Collection. He had two sons, Robert Nichols, poet and dramatist, and Philip Nichols, a civil servant, and two daughters, Irene, who married Sir George Gater, and Anne, married to Henry Strauss, 1st Baron Conesford.

Nichols died at Lawford Hall, Manningtree, Essex, aged 79, and is buried in the churchyard of St Mary's Church, Lawford.

Works
Love in Idleness: A Volume of Poems (1883), with H. C. Beeching and J. W. Mackail
Love's Looking Glass (1892), with Beeching and Mackail

References

External links
 
 

1859 births
1939 deaths
English male poets
People educated at Winchester College
Alumni of Balliol College, Oxford